The Little Kowai River is a river of the Canterbury region of New Zealand's South Island. It flows generally south from the Torlesse Range to join with the Kowai River two kilometres north of Springfield.

See also
List of rivers of New Zealand

References

Rivers of Canterbury, New Zealand
Rivers of New Zealand